A polyptych (Greek: poly- "many" and ptychē "fold") is a painting (usually panel painting) which is divided into sections, or panels. Specifically, a "diptych" is a two-part work of art; a "triptych" is a three-part work; a tetraptych or quadriptych has four parts, and so on.

Historically, polyptychs typically displayed one "central" or "main" panel that was usually the largest of the attachments; the other panels are called "side" panels, or "wings". Sometimes, as evident in the Ghent and Isenheim works (see below), the hinged panels can be varied in arrangement to show different "views" or "openings" in the piece. The upper panels often depict static scenes, while the lower register, the predella, often depict small narrative scenes.

Polyptychs were most commonly created by early Renaissance painters, the majority of whom designed their works to be altarpieces in churches and cathedrals. The polyptych form of art was also quite popular among ukiyo-e printmakers of Edo period Japan.

Some medieval manuscripts are polyptychs, particularly Carolingian works, in which the columns on the page are framed with borders that resemble polyptych paintings.

Examples
The Stefaneschi Polyptych, c. 1320, by Giotto
 The Ghent Altarpiece, completed in 1432 by Hubert van Eyck and Jan van Eyck
The Last Judgement (Lochner) 1435 by Stefan Lochner
 Polyptych of the Misericordia (1445–1462) by Piero della Francesca
 Polyptych-of-Saint-Augustine by Piero della Francesca 
 Beaune Altarpiece (1450) by Rogier van der Weyden
 Saint Augustine Polyptych (1470) by Perugino
 The Saint Vincent Panels (1470–1480) by Nuno Gonçalves
 The Monte San Martino Altarpiece (1471 ca.), by Carlo Crivelli
  St. Dominic Polyptych (1506–1508) by Lorenzo Lotto
 The Isenheim Altarpiece (1512–1516) by Matthias Grünewald
 Poema de Córdoba (1913-1915) by Julio Romero de Torres 
 The "quad-tych" created by fictional artist Sander Cohen, in the 2007 video game Bioshock.

See also

 Polyptych (document)

 
Picture framing
Altarpieces